Crean is an Irish surname anglicised from Ó Croidheáin meaning "descendant of Croidheán", the name Croidheán is derived from the word "croí/croidhe" meaning "heart". Notable people with this surname include:

 Anthony Crean (1911–1975), English priest
 Arthur Crean, American soldier
 David Crean, Australian politician
 Edward Crean, English rugby union player
 Eugene Crean (1854–1939), Irish nationalist politician
 Fiona Crean, Canadian ombudsman
 Frank Crean (1916–2008), Australian politician
Frank Crean (1875-1932), Canadian Civil engineer
 Gordon Gale Crean (1914–1976), Canadian diplomat
 Kelly Crean (born 1974), American actress
 Paddy Crean (1911–2003), British actor
 Simon Crean (born 1949), Australian politician
 Stephen Crean (1947–1985), Australian public servant
 Thomas Crean (1873–1923), Irish rugby union player and soldier
 Tom Crean (1877–1938), Irish explorer of the Antarctic
 Tom Crean (basketball coach) (born 1966), American college basketball coach

As a given name 
 Crean Brush, Irish-born Loyalist

See also

 Crean Hill, Ontario
 Crean, Cornwall

Anglicised Irish-language surnames
Surnames of Irish origin